In mathematics, a superperfect number is a positive integer n that satisfies

where σ is the divisor summatory function. Superperfect numbers are a generalization of perfect numbers.  The term was coined by D. Suryanarayana (1969).

The first few superperfect numbers are :

2, 4, 16, 64, 4096, 65536, 262144, 1073741824, ... .

To illustrate: it can be seen that 16 is a superperfect number as σ(16) = 1 + 2 + 4 + 8 + 16 = 31, and σ(31) = 1 + 31 = 32, thus σ(σ(16)) = 32 = 2 × 16.

If n is an even superperfect number, then n must be a power of 2, 2k, such that 2k+1 − 1 is a Mersenne prime.

It is not known whether there are any odd superperfect numbers. An odd superperfect number n would have to be a square number such that either n or σ(n) is divisible by at least three distinct primes. There are no odd superperfect numbers below 7.

Generalizations 
Perfect and superperfect numbers are examples of the wider class of m-superperfect numbers, which satisfy

corresponding to m=1 and 2 respectively.  For m ≥ 3 there are no even m-superperfect numbers.

The m-superperfect numbers are in turn examples of (m,k)-perfect numbers which satisfy

With this notation, perfect numbers are (1,2)-perfect, multiperfect numbers are (1,k)-perfect,  superperfect numbers are (2,2)-perfect and m-superperfect numbers are (m,2)-perfect.  Examples of classes of (m,k)-perfect numbers are:

{| class="wikitable"
|-
! m
! k
! (m,k)-perfect numbers
! OEIS sequence
|-
| 2
| 2
| 2, 4, 16, 64, 4096, 65536, 262144
| 
|-
| 2
| 3
| 8, 21, 512
| 
|-
| 2
| 4
| 15, 1023, 29127
| 
|-
| 2
| 6
| 42, 84, 160, 336, 1344, 86016, 550095, 1376256, 5505024
| 
|-
| 2
| 7
| 24, 1536, 47360, 343976
| 
|-
| 2
| 8
| 60, 240, 960, 4092, 16368, 58254, 61440, 65472, 116508, 466032, 710400, 983040, 1864128, 3932160, 4190208, 67043328, 119304192, 268173312, 1908867072
| 
|-
| 2
| 9
| 168, 10752, 331520, 691200, 1556480, 1612800, 106151936
| 
|-
| 2
| 10
| 480, 504, 13824, 32256, 32736, 1980342, 1396617984, 3258775296
| 
|-
| 2
| 11
| 4404480, 57669920, 238608384
| 
|-
| 2
| 12
| 2200380, 8801520, 14913024, 35206080, 140896000, 459818240, 775898880, 2253189120
| 
|-
| 3
| any
| 12, 14, 24, 52, 98, 156, 294, 684, 910, 1368, 1440, 4480, 4788, 5460, 5840, ...
| 
|-
| 4
| any
| 2, 3, 4, 6, 8, 10, 12, 15, 18, 21, 24, 26, 32, 39, 42, 60, 65, 72, 84, 96, 160, 182, ...
| 
|}

Notes

References 

 
 
 
 
 

Divisor function
Integer sequences
Unsolved problems in number theory